Hasanabad (also Romanized as Ḩasanābād) is a city & capital of Hasanabad District, Hasanabad Rural District, Eqlid County, Fars Province, Iran. At the 2006 census, its population was 1,921, in 377 families.

References 

Populated places in Eqlid County
Cities in Fars Province